This article lists all of the numbered regional roads in Regional Municipality of Niagara, Ontario.  This list also contains all recently downloaded regional roads (heretofore marked as "RR"), which are marked in grey.  The standard Niagara Regional Road sign is indicated at the right, with RR 20 providing the example.

References 

Niagara
Niagara Regional Roads
Niagara